Loren C. Murchison (December 17, 1898 – June 11, 1979) was an American athlete, double gold medal winner in 4×100 m relay at the Olympic Games.

Biography

At the 1920 Summer Olympics, Murchison finished fourth in 200 m and sixth in 100 m. He also ran the third leg in the gold medal winning United States 4x100 m relay team, which set a new world record of 42.2 s in the Olympic final. At the 1924 Summer Olympics, Murchison was again sixth in 100 m and won his second Olympic gold medal as an opening leg in the world record (41.0 s) setting American 4×100 m relay team.

Murchison was an outstanding indoor runner. He won 14 titles (9 individual and 5 in the relay) at the United States premier indoor athletics meet, the Millrose Games. He was also national indoor champion at the 60 y in 1919–20 and 1922–24, and 300 y in 1919–20 and 1923–24.

Murchison was also a prolific breaker of records indoors. Amongst the world best times he equaled or broke are:
 equaled 60 y best of 6.4 s in 1920, 1922 and 1923;
 established new 60 y best of 6.2 s in 1923;
 50 m of 6.0 s in 1925;
 300 y of 31.2 s;
 220 y best of 22.4 s.

It was such exploits that inspired Charley Paddock (1920 Olympic 100 m champion) to call Murchison "the greatest indoor sprinter of his generation and the finest starter of all-time.

In 1925 Murchison was struck with spinal meningitis and paralyzed from the waist down for the rest of his life.

A resident of Leisure Village in Lakewood Township, New Jersey, Murchison died at the age of 80 on June 11, 1979 at Point Pleasant Hospital in Point Pleasant, New Jersey.

References

1898 births
1979 deaths
American male sprinters
Athletes (track and field) at the 1920 Summer Olympics
Athletes (track and field) at the 1924 Summer Olympics
Olympic gold medalists for the United States in track and field
Sportspeople from Lakewood Township, New Jersey
People from Farmersville, Texas
Sportspeople from the Dallas–Fort Worth metroplex
Track and field athletes from Texas
Medalists at the 1924 Summer Olympics
Medalists at the 1920 Summer Olympics
USA Outdoor Track and Field Championships winners
USA Indoor Track and Field Championships winners
People with paraplegia